This is a complete list of seasons competed by the Edmonton Elks (formerly referred to as the Edmonton Eskimos), a Canadian Football League team.  While the team was founded in 1949, they did not join the CFL until it was founded in 1958.  Throughout their history, Edmonton has won 14 Grey Cups.

{| class="wikitable"
|-
!Leagueseason
!Clubseason
!League
!Division
!Finish
!Wins
!Losses
!Ties
!Playoffs
|-
!align="center"|1949
!align="center"|1949
|align="center"|WIFU
|align="center"|–
|align="center"|3rd
|align="center"|4
|align="center"|10
|align="center"|0
|
|-
!align="center"|1950
!align="center"|1950
|align="center"|WIFU
|align="center"|–
|align="center"|3rd
|align="center"|7
|align="center"|7
|align="center"|0
|Won W.I.F.U. Semi-Final (Roughriders) 21-1Lost W.I.F.U. Finals (Blue Bombers) 1-2 series
|-
!align="center"|1951
!align="center"|1951
|align="center"|WIFU
|align="center"|–
|align="center"|2nd
|align="center"|8
|align="center"|6
|align="center"|0
|Won W.I.F.U. Semi-Final (Blue Bombers) 4-1Lost W.I.F.U. Finals (Roughriders) 1-2 series
|-
!align="center"|1952
!align="center"|1952
|align="center" bgcolor="#ffeeaa"|WIFU*
|align="center"|–
|align="center"|2nd
|align="center"|9
|align="center"|6
|align="center"|1
|style="background: #FFEEAA"|Won W.I.F.U. Semi-Finals (Stampeders) 1-1 series (42-38 points)Won W.I.F.U. Finals (Blue Bombers) 2-1 seriesLost Grey Cup (Argonauts) 21-11
|-
!align="center"|1953
!align="center"|1953
|align="center"|WIFU
|align="center"|–
|align="center" bgcolor="#ffbbbb"|1st^
|align="center"|12
|align="center"|4
|align="center"|0
|Lost West Finals (Blue Bombers) 1-2 series
|-
!align="center"|1954
!align="center"|1954
|align="center" bgcolor="#ddffdd"|WIFU†*
|align="center"|–
|align="center" bgcolor="#ffbbbb"|1st^
|align="center"|11
|align="center"|5
|align="center"|0
|style="background: #CCFFCC"|Won West Finals (Blue Bombers) 2-1 seriesWon Grey Cup (Alouettes) 25-24
|-
!align="center"|1955
!align="center"|1955
|align="center" bgcolor="#ddffdd"|WIFU†*
|align="center"|–
|align="center" bgcolor="#ffbbbb"|1st^
|align="center"|14
|align="center"|2
|align="center"|0
|style="background: #CCFFCC"|Won West Finals (Blue Bombers) 2-0 seriesWon Grey Cup (Alouettes) 34-19
|-
!align="center"|1956
!align="center"|1956
|align="center" bgcolor="#ddffdd"|WIFU†*
|align="center"|–
|align="center" bgcolor="#ffbbbb"|1st^
|align="center"|11
|align="center"|5
|align="center"|0
|style="background: #CCFFCC"|Won West Finals (Roughriders) 2-1 seriesWon Grey Cup (Alouettes) 50-27
|-
!align="center"|1957
!align="center"|1957
|align="center"|WIFU
|align="center"|–
|align="center" bgcolor="#ffbbbb"|1st^
|align="center"|14
|align="center"|2
|align="center"|0
|Lost W.I.F.U. Finals (Blue Bombers) 1-2 series
|-
!align="center"|1958
!align="center"|1958
|align="center"|CFL
|align="center"|W.I.F.U.
|align="center"|2nd
|align="center"|9
|align="center"|6
|align="center"|1
|Won W.I.F.U. Semi-Finals (Roughriders) 2-0 seriesLost W.I.F.U. Finals (Blue Bombers) 1-2 series
|-
!align="center"|1959
!align="center"|1959
|align="center"|CFL
|align="center"|W.I.F.U.
|align="center"|2nd
|align="center"|10
|align="center"|6
|align="center"|0
|Won West Semi-Finals (Lions) 2-0 seriesLost W.I.F.U. Finals (Blue Bombers) 0-2 series
|-
!align="center"|1960
!align="center"|1960
|align="center"|CFL
|align="center" bgcolor="#ffeeaa"|W.I.F.U.*
|align="center"|2nd
|align="center"|10
|align="center"|6
|align="center"|0
|style="background: #FFEEAA"|Won West Semi-Finals (Stampeders) 2-0 seriesWon West Finals (Blue Bombers) 2-1 seriesLost Grey Cup (Rough Riders) 16-6
|-
!align="center"|1961
!align="center"|1961
|align="center"|CFL
|align="center"|West
|align="center"|2nd
|align="center"|10
|align="center"|5
|align="center"|1
|Lost West Semi-Finals (Stampeders) 1-1 series (27-26 points)
|-
!align="center"|1962
!align="center"|1962
|align="center"|CFL
|align="center"|West
|align="center"|5th
|align="center"|6
|align="center"|9
|align="center"|1
|
|-
!align="center"|1963
!align="center"|1963
|align="center"|CFL
|align="center"|West
|align="center"|5th
|align="center"|2
|align="center"|14
|align="center"|0
|
|-
!align="center"|1964
!align="center"|1964
|align="center"|CFL
|align="center"|West
|align="center"|4th
|align="center"|4
|align="center"|12
|align="center"|0
|
|-
!align="center"|1965
!align="center"|1965
|align="center"|CFL
|align="center"|West
|align="center"|5th
|align="center"|5
|align="center"|11
|align="center"|0
|
|-
!align="center"|1966
!align="center"|1966
|align="center"|CFL
|align="center"|West
|align="center"|3rd
|align="center"|6
|align="center"|9
|align="center"|1
|Lost West Semi-Final (Blue Bombers) 16-8
|-
!align="center"|1967
!align="center"|1967
|align="center"|CFL
|align="center"|West
|align="center"|3rd
|align="center"|9
|align="center"|6
|align="center"|1
|Lost West Semi-Final (Roughriders) 21-5
|-
!align="center"|1968
!align="center"|1968
|align="center"|CFL
|align="center"|West
|align="center"|3rd
|align="center"|8
|align="center"|7
|align="center"|1
|Lost West Semi-Final (Stampeders) 29-13
|-
!align="center"|1969
!align="center"|1969
|align="center"|CFL
|align="center"|West
|align="center"|4th
|align="center"|5
|align="center"|11
|align="center"|0
|
|-
!align="center"|1970
!align="center"|1970
|align="center"|CFL
|align="center"|West
|align="center"|2nd
|align="center"|9
|align="center"|7
|align="center"|0
|Lost West Semi-Finals (Stampeders) 16-9
|-
!align="center"|1971
!align="center"|1971
|align="center"|CFL
|align="center"|West
|align="center"|5th
|align="center"|6
|align="center"|10
|align="center"|0
|
|-
!align="center"|1972
!align="center"|1972
|align="center"|CFL
|align="center"|West
|align="center"|2nd
|align="center"|10
|align="center"|6
|align="center"|0
|Lost West Semi-Finals (Roughriders) 8-6
|-
!align="center"|1973
!align="center"|1973
|align="center"|CFL
|align="center" bgcolor="#ffeeaa"|West*
|align="center" bgcolor="#ffbbbb"|1st^
|align="center"|9
|align="center"|5
|align="center"|2
|style="background: #FFEEAA"|Won West Final (Roughriders) 25-23Lost Grey Cup (Rough Riders) 22-18
|-
!align="center"|1974
!align="center"|1974
|align="center"|CFL
|align="center" bgcolor="#ffeeaa"|West*
|align="center" bgcolor="#ffbbbb"|1st^
|align="center"|10
|align="center"|5
|align="center"|1
|style="background: #FFEEAA"|Won West Final (Roughriders) 31-27Lost Grey Cup (Alouettes) 20-7
|-
!align="center"|1975
!align="center"|1975
|align="center" bgcolor="#ccffcc"|CFL†
|align="center" bgcolor="#ffeeaa"|West*
|align="center" bgcolor="#ffbbbb"|1st^
|align="center"|12
|align="center"|4
|align="center"|0
|style="background: #CCFFCC"|Won West Final (Roughriders) 30-18Won Grey Cup (Alouettes) 9-8
|-
!align="center"|1976
!align="center"|1976
|align="center"|CFL
|align="center"|West
|align="center"|3rd
|align="center"|9
|align="center"|6
|align="center"|1
|Won West Semi-Final (Blue Bombers) 14-12Lost West Final (Roughriders) 23-13
|-
!align="center"|1977
!align="center"|1977
|align="center"|CFL
|align="center" bgcolor="#ffeeaa"|West*
|align="center" bgcolor="#ffbbbb"|1st^
|align="center"|10
|align="center"|6
|align="center"|0
|style="background: #FFEEAA"|Won West Final (Lions) 38-1Lost Grey Cup (Alouettes) 41-6
|-
!align="center"|1978
!align="center"|1978
|align="center" bgcolor="#ccffcc"|CFL†
|align="center" bgcolor="#ffeeaa"|West*
|align="center" bgcolor="#ffbbbb"|1st^
|align="center"|10
|align="center"|4
|align="center"|2
|style="background: #CCFFCC"|Won West Final (Stampeders) 26-13Won Grey Cup (Alouettes) 20-13
|-
!align="center"|1979
!align="center"|1979
|align="center" bgcolor="#ccffcc"|CFL†
|align="center" bgcolor="#ffeeaa"|West*
|align="center" bgcolor="#ffbbbb"|1st^
|align="center"|12
|align="center"|2
|align="center"|2
|style="background: #CCFFCC"|Won West Final (Stampeders) 19-17Won Grey Cup (Alouettes) 17-9
|-
!align="center"|1980
!align="center"|1980
|align="center" bgcolor="#ccffcc"|CFL†
|align="center" bgcolor="#ffeeaa"|West*
|align="center" bgcolor="#ffbbbb"|1st^
|align="center"|13
|align="center"|3
|align="center"|0
|style="background: #CCFFCC"|Won West Final (Blue Bombers 34-24Won Grey Cup (Tiger-Cats) 48-10
|-
!align="center"|1981
!align="center"|1981
|align="center" bgcolor="#ccffcc"|CFL†
|align="center" bgcolor="#ffeeaa"|West*
|align="center" bgcolor="#ffbbbb"|1st^
|align="center"|14
|align="center"|1
|align="center"|1
|style="background: #CCFFCC"|Won West Final (Lions) 22-16Won Grey Cup (Rough Riders) 26-23
|-
!align="center"|1982
!align="center"|1982
|align="center" bgcolor="#ccffcc"|CFL†
|align="center" bgcolor="#ffeeaa"|West*
|align="center" bgcolor="#ffbbbb"|1st^
|align="center"|11
|align="center"|5
|align="center"|0
|style="background: #CCFFCC"|Won West Final (Blue Bombers) 24-21Won Grey Cup (Argonauts) 32-16
|-
!align="center"|1983
!align="center"|1983
|align="center"|CFL
|align="center"|West
|align="center"|3rd
|align="center"|8
|align="center"|8
|align="center"|0
|Lost West Semi-Final (Blue Bombers) 49-22
|-
!align="center"|1984
!align="center"|1984
|align="center"|CFL
|align="center"|West
|align="center"|3rd
|align="center"|9
|align="center"|7
|align="center"|0
|Lost West Semi-Final (Blue Bombers) 55-20
|-
!align="center"|1985
!align="center"|1985
|align="center"|CFL
|align="center"|West
|align="center"|3rd
|align="center"|10
|align="center"|6
|align="center"|0
|Lost West Semi-Final (Blue Bombers) 22-15
|-
!align="center"|1986
!align="center"|1986
|align="center"|CFL
|align="center" bgcolor="#ffeeaa"|West*
|align="center" bgcolor="#ffbbbb"|1st^
|align="center"|13
|align="center"|4
|align="center"|1
|style="background: #FFEEAA"|Won West Semi-Final (Stampeders) 27-18Won West Final (Lions) 41-5Lost Grey Cup (Tiger-Cats) 39-15
|-
!align="center"|1987
!align="center"|1987
|align="center" bgcolor="#ccffcc"|CFL†
|align="center" bgcolor="#ffeeaa"|West*
|align="center"|2nd
|align="center"|11
|align="center"|7
|align="center"|0
|style="background: #CCFFCC"|Won West Semi-Final (Stampeders) 30-16Won West Final (Lions) 31-7Won Grey Cup (Argonauts) 38-36
|-
!align="center"|1988
!align="center"|1988
|align="center"|CFL
|align="center"|West
|align="center" bgcolor="#ffbbbb"|1st^
|align="center"|11
|align="center"|7
|align="center"|0
|Lost West Final (Lions) 37-19
|-
!align="center"|1989
!align="center"|1989
|align="center"|CFL
|align="center"|West
|align="center" bgcolor="#ffbbbb"|1st^
|align="center"|16
|align="center"|2
|align="center"|0
|Lost West Final (Roughriders) 32-21
|-
!align="center"|1990
!align="center"|1990
|align="center"|CFL
|align="center" bgcolor="#ffeeaa"|West*
|align="center"|2nd
|align="center"|10
|align="center"|8
|align="center"|0
|style="background: #FFEEAA"|Won West Semi-Final (Roughriders) 43-27Won West Final (Stampeders) 43-23Lost Grey Cup (Blue Bombers) 50-11
|-
!align="center"|1991
!align="center"|1991
|align="center"|CFL
|align="center"|West
|align="center" bgcolor="#ffbbbb"|1st^
|align="center"|12
|align="center"|6
|align="center"|0
|Lost West Final (Stampeders) 38-36
|-
!align="center"|1992
!align="center"|1992
|align="center"|CFL
|align="center"|West
|align="center"|2nd
|align="center"|10
|align="center"|8
|align="center"|0
|Won West Semi-Final (Roughriders) 22-20Lost West Final (Stampeders) 23-22
|-
!align="center"|1993
!align="center"|1993
|align="center" bgcolor="#ccffcc"|CFL†
|align="center" bgcolor="#ffeeaa"|West*
|align="center"|2nd
|align="center"|12
|align="center"|6
|align="center"|0
|style="background: #CCFFCC"|Won West Semi-Final (Roughriders) 51-13Won West Final (Stampeders) 29-15Won Grey Cup (Blue Bombers) 33-23
|-
!align="center"|1994
!align="center"|1994
|align="center"|CFL
|align="center"|West
|align="center"|2nd
|align="center"|13
|align="center"|5
|align="center"|0
|Lost West Semi-Final (Lions) 24-23
|-
!align="center"|1995
!align="center"|1995
|align="center"|CFL
|align="center"|North
|align="center"|2nd
|align="center"|13
|align="center"|5
|align="center"|0
|Won North Semi-Final (Lions) 26-15Lost North Final (Stampeders) 37-4
|-
!align="center"|1996
!align="center"|1996
|align="center"|CFL
|align="center" bgcolor="#ffeeaa"|West*
|align="center"|2nd
|align="center"|11
|align="center"|7
|align="center"|0
|style="background: #FFEEAA"|Won West Semi-Final (Blue Bombers) 68-7Won West Final (Stampeders) 15-12Lost Grey Cup (Argonauts) 43-37
|-
!align="center"|1997
!align="center"|1997
|align="center"|CFL
|align="center"|West
|align="center" bgcolor="#ffbbbb"|1st^
|align="center"|12
|align="center"|6
|align="center"|0
|Lost West Final (Roughriders) 31-30
|-
!align="center"|1998
!align="center"|1998
|align="center"|CFL
|align="center"|West
|align="center"|2nd
|align="center"|9
|align="center"|9
|align="center"|0
|Won West Semi-Final (Lions) 40-33Lost West Final (Stampeders) 33-10
|-
!align="center"|1999
!align="center"|1999
|align="center"|CFL
|align="center"|West
|align="center"|3rd
|align="center"|6
|align="center"|12
|align="center"|0
|Lost West Semi-Final (Stampeders) 30-17
|-
!align="center"|2000
!align="center"|2000
|align="center"|CFL
|align="center"|West
|align="center"|2nd
|align="center"|10
|align="center"|8
|align="center"|0
|Lost West Semi-Final (Lions) 34-32
|-
!align="center"|2001
!align="center"|2001
|align="center"|CFL
|align="center"|West
|align="center" bgcolor="#ffbbbb"|1st^
|align="center"|9
|align="center"|9
|align="center"|0
|Lost West Final (Stampeders) 34-16
|-
!align="center"|2002
!align="center"|2002
|align="center"|CFL
|align="center" bgcolor="#ffeeaa"|West*
|align="center" bgcolor="#ffbbbb"|1st^
|align="center"|13
|align="center"|5
|align="center"|0
|style="background: #FFEEAA"|Won West Final (Blue Bombers) 33-30Lost Grey Cup (Alouettes) 25-16
|-
!align="center"|2003
!align="center"|2003
|align="center" bgcolor="#ccffcc"|CFL†
|align="center" bgcolor="#ffeeaa"|West*
|align="center" bgcolor="#ffbbbb"|1st^
|align="center"|13
|align="center"|5
|align="center"|0
|style="background: #CCFFCC"|Won West Final (Roughriders) 30-23Won Grey Cup (Alouettes) 34-22
|-
!align="center"|2004
!align="center"|2004
|align="center"|CFL
|align="center"|West
|align="center"|2nd
|align="center"|9
|align="center"|9
|align="center"|0
|Lost West Semi-Final (Roughriders) 14-6
|-
!align="center"|2005
!align="center"|2005
|align="center" bgcolor="#ccffcc"|CFL†
|align="center" bgcolor="#ffeeaa"|West*
|align="center"|3rd
|align="center"|11
|align="center"|7
|align="center"|0
|style="background: #CCFFCC"|Won West Semi-Final (Stampeders) 33-26Won West Final (Lions) 28-23Won Grey Cup (Alouettes) 38-35
|-
!align="center"|2006
!align="center"|2006
|align="center"|CFL
|align="center"|West
|align="center"|4th
|align="center"|7
|align="center"|11
|align="center"|0
|
|-
!align="center"|2007
!align="center"|2007
|align="center"|CFL
|align="center"|West
|align="center"|4th
|align="center"|5
|align="center"|12
|align="center"|1
|
|-
!align="center"|2008
!align="center"|2008
|align="center"|CFL
|align="center"|West
|align="center"|4th
|align="center"|10
|align="center"|8
|align="center"|0
|Won East Semi-Final (Blue Bombers) 29-21Lost East Final (Alouettes) 36-26
|-
!align="center"|2009
!align="center"|2009
|align="center"|CFL
|align="center"|West
|align="center"|3rd
|align="center"|9
|align="center"|9
|align="center"|0
|Lost West Semi-Final (Stampeders) 24-21
|-
!align="center"|2010
!align="center"|2010
|align="center"|CFL
|align="center"|West
|align="center"|4th
|align="center"|7
|align="center"|11
|align="center"|0
| 
|-
!align="center"|2011
!align="center"|2011
|align="center"|CFL
|align="center"|West
|align="center"|2nd
|align="center"|11
|align="center"|7
|align="center"|0
|Won West Semi-Final (Stampeders) 33-19Lost West Final (Lions) 40-23
|-
!align="center"|2012
!align="center"|2012
|align="center"|CFL
|align="center"|West
|align="center"|4th
|align="center"|7
|align="center"|11
|align="center"|0
|Lost East Semi-Final (Argonauts) 42-26
|-
!align="center"|2013
!align="center"|2013
|align="center"|CFL
|align="center"|West
|align="center"|4th
|align="center"|4
|align="center"|14
|align="center"|0
|
|-
!align="center"|2014
!align="center"|2014
|align="center"|CFL
|align="center"|West
|align="center"|2nd
|align="center"|12
|align="center"|6
|align="center"|0
|Won West Semi-Final (Roughriders) 18-10Lost West Final (Stampeders) 43-18
|-
!align="center"|2015
!align="center"|2015
|align="center" bgcolor="#ccffcc"|CFL†
|align="center" bgcolor="#ffeeaa"|West*|align="center" bgcolor="#ffbbbb"|1st^|align="center"|14
|align="center"|4
|align="center"|0
|style="background: #CCFFCC"|Won West Final (Stampeders) 45–31Won Grey Cup (Redblacks) 26-20|-
!align="center"|2016
!align="center"|2016
|align="center"|CFL
|align="center"|West
|align="center"|4th
|align="center"|10
|align="center"|8
|align="center"|0
|Won East Semi-Final (Tiger-Cats) 24–21Lost East Final (Redblacks) 35–23 
|-
!align="center"|2017
!align="center"|2017
|align="center"|CFL
|align="center"|West
|align="center"|3rd
|align="center"|12
|align="center"|6
|align="center"|0
|Won West Semi-Final (Blue Bombers) 39-32Lost West Final (Stampeders) 32-28
|-
!align="center"|2018
!align="center"|2018
|align="center"|CFL
|align="center"|West
|align="center"|5th
|align="center"|9
|align="center"|9
|align="center"|0
|
|-
!align="center"|2019
!align="center"|2019
|align="center"|CFL
|align="center"|West
|align="center"|4th
|align="center"|8
|align="center"|10
|align="center"|0
|Won East Semi-Final (Alouettes) 37-29'Lost East Final (Tiger-Cats) 36-16
|-
!align="center"|2020
!align="center"|2020
|align="center"|CFL
|align="center"|West
!align="center" colSpan="5"|Season cancelled due to COVID 19 pandemic''
|-
!align="center"|2021
!align="center"|2021
|align="center"|CFL
|align="center"|West
|align="center"|5th
|align="center"|3
|align="center"|11
|align="center"|0
|
|-
!align="center"|2022
!align="center"|2022
|align="center"|CFL
|align="center"|West
|align="center"|5th
|align="center"|4
|align="center"|14
|align="center"|0
|
|-
!align="center" colSpan="5"|Regular Season Totals (1949–2022)
|align="center"|692
|align="center"|520
|align="center"|18
|
|-
!align="center" colSpan="5"|Playoff Totals (1949–2022)
|align="center"|58
|align="center"|47
|align="center"|
|
|-
!align="center" colSpan="5"|Grey Cup Totals (1949–2022)
|align="center"|14
|align="center"|9
|align="center"|
|
|-

Edmonton Elks lists